Can't Catch Me may refer to:

"Can't Catch Me", song from Back to Basics (Anvil album)
"Can't Catch Me", song from Stories (Avicii album)